Verbal agreement may refer to:
 Oral contract or verbal contract, a contract the terms of which have been agreed by spoken communication
 Verbal agreement or concord, grammatical agreement of a verb form with its subject or objects; see Grammatical conjugation#Verbal agreement

See also
 Verbal (disambiguation)